Ali Jackson may refer to:

Alistair Jackson (born 1988), known as Ali, Northern Irish racing driver
Ali Jackson (jazz drummer) (born 1976), American jazz drummer
Ali Jackson (jazz bassist) (died 1987), American jazz bassist and composer